The BTB/POZ domain is a common structural domain contained within some proteins.

The BTB (for BR-C, ttk and bab) or POZ (for Pox virus and Zinc finger) domain is present near the N-terminus of a fraction of zinc finger proteins and in proteins that contain the Kelch motif and a family of pox virus proteins. The BTB/POZ domain mediates homomeric dimerisation and in some instances heteromeric dimerisation. The structure of the dimerised PLZF BTB/POZ domain has been solved and consists of a tightly intertwined homodimer. The central scaffolding of the protein is made up of a cluster of alpha-helices flanked by short beta-sheets at both the top and bottom of the molecule. BTB/POZ domains from several zinc finger proteins have been shown to mediate transcriptional repression and to interact with components of histone deacetylase co-repressor complexes including N-CoR and SMRT. The POZ or BTB domain is also known as BR-C/Ttk or ZiN.

References 

Protein domains